Langlois or L'Anglois is a surname of French origin. It may refer to:

Aimé Langlois (1880–1954), Liberal party member of the Canadian House of Commons
Al Langlois (born 1934), Canadian ice hockey player
Alexandre Langlois (1788–1854), French Indologist and translator
Anabelle Langlois (born 1981), Canadian pairs figure skater
Bruno Langlois (born 1979), Canadian racing cyclist
Charles Langlois (actor) (1692–1762), French actor who spent a large part of his career in Sweden
Charles Langlois (politician) (born 1938), member of the Canadian House of Commons from 1988 to 1993
Charles-Victor Langlois (1863–1929) French historian and paleographer who taught at the Sorbonne
Charlie Langlois (1894–1965), Canadian professional hockey player
Chibly Langlois (born 1958), Haitian cardinal of the Roman Catholic Church
Christian Langlois (born 1963), Film director from Montreal, Canada
Daniel Langlois, Canadian media company founder and philanthropist
Denis Langlois (born 1968), French race walker
Ernest Langlois (1857–1924), French medievalist, professor at the University of Lille
Espérance Langlois (1805–1864), French painter and printmaker
Esther Langlois (1571–1624), Scottish miniaturist, embroiderer, calligrapher, translator and writer
Étienne, stage name of Steven Langlois (born 1971), Warner Music Canada recording artist
Eustache-Hyacinthe Langlois (3 August 1777 – 29 September 1837), French painter, draftsman, engraver and writer
François Langlois (born 1948), Canadian politician and lawyer
François L’Anglois (1589–1647) a French painter, engraver, printer, bookseller, publisher and art dealer
Godfroy Langlois (1866–1928), politician, journalist and lawyer in Quebec
Henri Langlois (1914–1977), pioneer of film preservation and restoration
Hippolyte Langlois (1839–1912), French general and writer on military science
Jean François Langlois (born 1808), New Zealand whaler and coloniser
Jean Langlois (1824–1886), Quebec lawyer, professor, and political figure
Jean-Charles Langlois (1789–1870), French soldier and painter
Joseph Langlois (1909–1964), Liberal party member of the Canadian House of Commons
Joseph-Alphonse Langlois (1860–1927), politician Quebec, Canada and a Member of the Legislative Assembly of Quebec (MLA)
Léopold Langlois (1913–1996), Canadian lawyer and parliamentarian
Lisa Langlois (born 1959), Canadian actress
Lloyd Langlois (born 1962), Canadian freestyle skier
Pascal Langlois, English actor, played supporting roles in television dramas since 1999
Paul Langlois (born 1964), Canadian guitarist
Paul Langlois (Canadian politician) (born 1926), Liberal party member of the Canadian House of Commons
Philippe Langlois (1817–1884), Norman language writer in Jèrriais
Pierre Langlois (canoer) (born 1958), French sprint canoeist who competed in the early 1980s
Pierre Langlois (economist), Canadian economist and political strategist
Pierre Langlois (politician) (1750–1830), merchant and political figure in Lower Canada
Polyclès Langlois (29 September 1814 – 30 November 1872), French writer, cartoonist and painter
Raymond Langlois (born 1936), Ralliement créditiste and Social Credit party member of the Canadian House of Commons
Richard Normand Langlois (born 1952), American economist and currently professor
Stephen Langlois, Chicago area chef and author of Prairie: Cuisine from the Heartland (1991)
Thomas Langlois Lefroy (1776–1869), Irish-Huguenot politician and judge
Yves Langlois (born 1947), member of terrorist group Front de libération du Québec

Etymology
The name comes from the French language. Langlois is a contracted form of L'Anglois. L’ is a contraction of the masculine definite article "le" and is translated as "the". Anglois is a disused French form of "anglais", the adjective of "Angleterre", England.

See also
Langlois de Sézanne (1757–1845), French portraitist and pastel artist
Langlois, Oregon, unincorporated community in Curry County, Oregon, United States, on the Oregon Coast
Langlois Bridge, drawbridge in Arles, France, subject of several paintings by Vincent van Gogh in 1888
Langlois Bridge at Arles (Van Gogh series)
Daniel Langlois Foundation, non-profit, philanthropic organization
Langlois reagent, Sodium trifluoromethanesulfinate (CF3SO2Na), the sodium salt of trifluoromethanesulfinic acid
Langloisia

Surnames of Norman origin
French-language surnames